The comb flounder (Marleyella bicolorata) is a flatfish of the family Pleuronectidae. Its natural habitat is the tropical waters of the western Indian Ocean, from KwaZulu-Natal and Mozambique in Southern Africa, to coastal Tanzania and Kenya in the African Great lakes region, to Somalia in the Horn of Africa, to Karnataka and Maharashtra in India.

Description
The comb flounder is a right-eyed flatfish. Its upper (eyed) side is dark brown, marked with vaguely cruciform dark spots and blotches, with round black spots on the head and a dark bar at the base of the caudal fin. The underside is also dark brown.

References

comb flounder
Marine fauna of East Africa
comb flounder